Francis Thomas Mann (3 March 1888 – 6 October 1964) was an English cricketer. He played for the Malvern XI, Cambridge University, Middlesex and England. Mann captained England on the 1922–23 tour of South Africa, winning the five match series 2–1.

Mann was born in Winchmore Hill, Middlesex. During World War I he was an officer of the Scots Guards and was three times wounded and three times mentioned in dispatches.  He died, aged 76, in Milton Lilbourne, Wiltshire.

His son, George Mann, also captained Middlesex County Cricket Club and England, making them the first father and son to have each captained Middlesex and, moreover, the first to have each captained England, at cricket. Simon Mann, the security expert and mercenary, is his grandson.

References
  Frank Mann, CricketArchive. Retrieved 2020-07-29. 
 Hodgson D (2001) Obituary of George Mann, The Independent, 16 August 2001. Retrieved 2020-07-29.
 Keating F (2009) The spinner who saved the day for 'Jim' Swanton, The Guardian, 16 December 2009. Retrieved 2020-07-29.
 Club History. Cranbourne Cricket Club.

External links

1888 births
1964 deaths
Scots Guards officers
British Army personnel of World War I
Cambridge University cricketers
England Test cricket captains
Middlesex cricket captains
Marylebone Cricket Club cricketers
Gentlemen cricketers
North v South cricketers
People educated at Malvern College
Presidents of Middlesex County Cricket Club
People from Winchmore Hill
England cricket team selectors
English cricketers of 1919 to 1945
Cricketers from Greater London
English cricketers
Military personnel from Middlesex
H. D. G. Leveson Gower's XI cricketers
Demobilised Officers cricketers
Middlesex cricketers
P. F. Warner's XI cricketers
Marylebone Cricket Club South African Touring Team cricketers
England Test cricketers